The Kardinal-Frings-Gymnasium (KFG, until 1979 Erzbischöfliches Gymnasium Beuel) is a private catholic secondary school of the Roman Catholic Archdiocese of Cologne in Beuel, a borough of the former German capital Bonn in North Rhine-Westphalia.

History 
The school was founded in 1964 as Erzbischöfliches Gymnasium Beuel (EBG) by the Archbishop of Cologne, Josef Kardinal Frings. It was a boys´ school. The school building in the south of Beuel, which includes an assembly hall, a sports field, three sports halls, a cafeteria and a nuclear bunker was planned by the famous architect Joachim Schürmann. After Frings' death in 1978, the school decided to assume the name of its founder and was officially named as Kardinal-Frings-Gymnasium on December 8, 1979. In 1988, the school was opened for girls.

Headmasters

Profile 
English and Latin are compulsory languages at the school. Moreover, the students can decide to learn French from class 8 and Spanish from class 10.There's also a voluntary Italian-course for students in grade 9. In the advanced level, there exist corporations with the Liebfrauenschule Bonn and the Sankt-Adelheid-Gymnasium.

The school is known for its brass orchestra. The popular German brass band Querbeat, which is active in the Cologne Carnival, was founded in 2001 as a school band of the Kardinal-Frings-Gymnasium.In 2001, the school initiated the Social Project Armenia. At an annual run the students collect money, which is used for an exchange program, the support of German lessons at two partner schools in Gyumri and the renovating of village schools in the north-Armenian Region Shirak. The donation volume in the last 15 years is more than 250.000 Euros (December 2017).

On July 3, 2018, the KFG hosted a ten-minute live switch to the German ESA-astronaut Alexander Gerst, who answered the students' questions from the International Space Station ISS via amateur radio. The contact was part of the ARISS project and was carried out by the German Amateur Radio Club and the German Aerospace Center. Guests included the former astronaut Reinhold Ewald.

Partner schools 
  Tscharenzschool (Gjumri, Armenia)
  Tumanyanschool (Gjumri, Armenia)
  King's School (Sydney, Australia)
  Central Coast Grammar School (Erina, Australia)
  Colegio Alemán (Santiago de Chile, Chile)
  Liceo Linguistico of the Collegio Vescovile Pio X (Treviso, Italy)
  CEU Sanchinarro (Madrid, Spain)
  Colegio Santa Maria Magdalena Sofia (Palma de Mallorca, Spain)
  The school is participating in the Erasmus+-programm of the European Commission

Notable alumni 

 Jan-Ingwer Callsen-Bracker, German footballer at FC Augsburg
 Sven-Ole Frahm, German artist
 Bruno Kahl, president of the German Federal Intelligence Service
 Markus Kurth, politician in the German parliament for Alliance 90/The Greens
 Deborah Schöneborn, long-distance runner
 Rabea Schöneborn, long-distance runner
 Fabian Thülig, former German Basketballer at Telekom Baskets Bonn

Notable teachers 
 Peter Kohlgraf, chaplain and catechist at the KFG 1999–2003, Bishop of Mainz

See also 

 Education in Germany
 List of schools in Germany
 Catholic Church in Germany

References

External links 
 
 Official website of the Kardinal-Frings-Gymnasium (in German)
Film "Das KFG"

North Rhine-Westphalia
Schools in North Rhine-Westphalia
Private schools in Germany
Catholic secondary schools in Germany
Educational institutions established in 1964
Schools in Bonn
High schools in Germany
Gymnasiums in Germany
1964 establishments in West Germany